Eurydoxa is a genus of moths belonging to the subfamily Tortricinae of the family Tortricidae.

Species
Eurydoxa advena Filipjev, 1930
Eurydoxa indigena Yasuda, 1978
Eurydoxa mesoclasta (Meyrick, 1908)
Eurydoxa rhodopa Diakonoff, 1950

See also
List of Tortricidae genera

References

 , 1930, C. r. Acad. Sci. U.R.S.S (A) 1930: 373.
 , 2005, World Catalogue of Insects 5.

External links
tortricidae.com

Ceracini
Tortricidae genera